Qazaxlı or Gazakhly may refer to:
Qazaxlı, Dashkasan, Azerbaijan
Qazaxlı, Samukh, Azerbaijan